"It Takes a Little Rain (To Make Love Grow)" is a song written by Roger Murrah, Steve Dean and James Dean Hicks, and recorded by American country music group The Oak Ridge Boys.  It was released in February 1987 as the first single from the album Where the Fast Lane Ends.  It was their fourteenth number-one country single. The single went to number one for one week, spending a total of fourteen weeks on the chart.

Charts

Weekly charts

Year-end charts

References

1987 singles
The Oak Ridge Boys songs
Songs written by Roger Murrah
Song recordings produced by Jimmy Bowen
MCA Records singles
1987 songs
Songs written by James Dean Hicks
Songs written by Steve Dean